Angel Guerreros (born 7 January 1953) is a Paraguayan sprinter. He competed in the men's 100 metres at the 1972 Summer Olympics.

References

1953 births
Living people
Athletes (track and field) at the 1972 Summer Olympics
Paraguayan male sprinters
Olympic athletes of Paraguay
Place of birth missing (living people)
20th-century Paraguayan people